Gert Jacobus Delarey du Preez (born 12 June 1975), known as Delarey du Preez, is a South African former rugby union international who represented the Springboks in two Test matches.

Born and raised in Queenstown, de Preez was a SA Schools representative player and competed for the Border Bulldogs after school. He played for the Cats in the Super 12 and had a season in England with Gloucester in 2004.

In 2002 he featured in two Tests for the Springboks as a hooker, debuting against Samoa in Pretoria. He scored a try against the Samoans within two minutes of coming off the bench. His other Test appearance was a Tri-Nations match against Australia in Brisbane, where he was brought into the game for the final 10 minutes.

See also
List of South Africa national rugby union players

References

External links

1975 births
Living people
South African rugby union players
South Africa international rugby union players
People from Queenstown, South Africa
Rugby union players from the Eastern Cape
Rugby union hookers
Lions (United Rugby Championship) players
Border Bulldogs players
Gloucester Rugby players